Ramis may refer to:

Surname
 Harold Ramis (1944–2014), American actor, director and screenwriter
 Iván Ramis (born 1984), Spanish footballer
 Jean-Pierre Ramis (born 1943), French mathematician
 Juan Ramis (1746–1819), Spanish historian
 Jonathan Ramis (born 1989), Uruguayan footballer
 Llucia Ramis (born 1977), Spanish writer and journalist
 Luis Miguel Ramis (born 1970), Spanish footballer 
 Magali García Ramis (born 1946), Puerto Rican writer

Other
 Ramis, Armenia, ancient settlement in Goghtn Region of Armenia
 RAMIS (software) fourth-generation programming language

Catalan-language surnames